The 1974 Baltimore Colts season was the 22nd season for the team in the National Football League. The Colts finished with a record of 2 wins and 12 losses, fifth in the AFC East.

Second-year head coach Howard Schnellenberger was fired after three games, after an argument with owner Robert Irsay over whether Marty Domres or Bert Jones should start at quarterback for the Colts.

General manager Joe Thomas took over the head coaching duties for the remainders of the season, but could direct the team to only two wins, both on the road, as the Colts failed to win a home game during the 1974 season. This would be the last time the Colts would fail to win a home game in a non-strike season until their abysmal 1–15 1991 season, when the team was based in Indianapolis.

Offseason

NFL Draft

Staff

Final roster

Regular season 

All-Pro linebacker Ted Hendricks signed a future contract with the World Football League, and was then traded by the Colts to the Green Bay Packers by general manager Joe Thomas. (Hendricks never ended up playing for the bankrupt WFL, and made four more Pro Bowls in his career.)

Schedule

Standings

Season summary

Week 2 vs Packers

References

See also 
 History of the Indianapolis Colts
 Indianapolis Colts seasons
 Colts–Patriots rivalry

Baltimore Colts
1974
Baltimore Colts